The 2012–13 season (officially known as Liga de Plata) will be El Salvador's Segunda División de Fútbol Salvadoreño The season will be split into two championships Apertura 2012 and Clausura 2013. The champions of the Apertura and Clausura play the direct promotion playoff every year. The winner of that series ascends to Primera División de Fútbol de El Salvador.
The Apertura 2012 will be named the Torneo Luis Baltazar Ramírez named after the 1982 world cup player Luis Ramírez Zapata.

Promotion and relegation 2012–2013 season
Teams promoted to Primera División de Fútbol Profesional - Apertura 2012
 Santa Tecla

Teams relegated to Segunda División de Fútbol Salvadoreño  - Apertura 2012
 Vista Hermosa

Teams relegated to Tercera División de Fútbol Profesional - Apertura 2012
 Topiltzín

Teams promoted from Tercera Division De Fútbol Profesional - Apertura 2011
 Espíritu Santo
 Turín FESA
 Ciclon de Golfo

Teams that failed to register for the - Apertura 2012
  Fuerte Aguilares
 Municipal Santa Maria

Teams Information 

The league currently consists of the following 20 teams:

Apertura 2012

Personnel and sponsoring

Overall table

Group standings

Grupo Centro Occidente

Grupo Centro Oriente

Final phase

Quarterfinals

First leg

Second leg

Semi-finals

First leg

Second leg

Finals

First leg

Second leg

Individual awards

Clausura 2013

Personnel and sponsoring

Overall table

Group standings

Grupo Centro Occidente

Grupo Centro Oriente

Final phase

Individual awards

Segunda División de Fútbol Salvadoreño seasons
2012–13 in Salvadoran football
EL Sal